Slatko (meaning "sweet") is a thin fruit preserve made of fruit or rose petals in Bulgarian, Macedonian, and Serbian cuisine. Almost any kind of fruit can be used, like wild strawberry, blueberry, plum and cherry. Slatko is used as a topping for ice cream and waffle shortcakes, and as a filling in pancakes.

Traditions
Traditionally, all guests in Bulgarian and Serbian homes are greeted with a spoonful of slatko/sladko and a cup of water as soon as seated. Particularly honoured guests are offered twice, although any guest can ask for another taste, to honour the housekeeper. For the second taste another spoon must be used. To ask for the third time, if not offered, is regarded as an improper behaviour, although usually granted. Alternatively, in the same manner, the guests may be offered honey (or asked to choose). Prior to the creation of Yugoslavia, the tradition of slatko was common and widespread only in the historical Serbia, south of Sava and Danube and was unknown in Vojvodina or other parts of Austro-Hungarian Empire.

Variants 

The most usual types of slatko are those made of whole strawberries, slightly unripe skinned plums or sour cherries. Other fresh fruits like raspberries, sweet cherries, watermelon cubes, rose petals, quinces, grapes, figs, skinned apricot halves or quarters, peaches, blueberries, blackberries or redcurrants can also be used. If a plum slatko is prepared, walnut halves or almonds may be added to the mixture or even inserted into the plums themselves to replace the pits. Some fruits and vegetables (like rhubarb and physalis) rarely grown in Serbia have also been demonstrated to be well suited for slatko. Frozen berries and fruits may be used as well, but the amount of water and the cooking time should be adjusted accordingly.

See also
 List of dessert sauces

References 

Serbian cuisine
Bulgarian cuisine
Dessert sauces
Jams and jellies